Adelaide Hills Tarmac Rally is an annual event held around Willunga, south of Adelaide, South Australia.  The event is run under CAMS regulations and is open to a variety of Tarmac vehicles.

2009 Adelaide Hills Tarmac Rally will be its 4th year, and will expand to a full two-day event over at least 17 stages.

Proposed Event Summary for 2009 will be based on 2008

Past Events

2008 was held on Sunday 29 June over 10 stages with 57 km competitive.  A total of 53 vehicles took part including the Lamborghini Gallardo Superleggera of Kevin Weeks and Bec Crunkhorne, and the Ferrari 360 Challenge of Brenton Griguol and Simon Fitzpatrick.

Stages were held the Old Willunga Hill, Wickhams Hill, Hindmarsh Tiers, Tooperang and Yundi Roads - each stage run twice.

2008 Event Summary

The event will be held under the International Sporting Code of the FIA, the National Competition Rules of CAMS, the National Rally Code, the 2008 Conditions of Rallying for South Australia, the 2008 SA Rally Championship Series Regulations, 2008 Tarmac Standing Regulations with the approval of ARCom, these Event Supplementary Regulations, Further Regulations and any Bulletins or Instructions to competitors that may be issued.

Where there is any divergence between THE 2008 CAMS MANUAL, the 2008 CAMS TARMAC STANDING REGULATIONS, THE 2008 SA RALLY SERIES REGULATIONS, THE 2008 CONDITIONS OF RALLYING FOR SOUTH AUSTRALIA and these Event Supplementary Regulations, The Event Supplementary Regulations will take precedence.

Will be a Special Stage Rally using A to A timing – as per National Rally Code 1.33.

Will be a Tarmac Rally using A to A timing – as per National Rally Code 1.33.

Is approved to run by CAMS and ARCOM.

Will be the stand alone SA Tarmac Rally Championship event, and Round 3 of the SA Rally Championship.

Is open to Classic – Category 1 to 6 as per CAMS Classic Tarmac Rally Technical Regulations and Modern – M1, M2, M3 and M4 as per CAMS Modern Tarmac Technical Regulations, including PRC and Group N Rally Cars

Previous winners
2009 Andrew Burnard / Brian Virgo  - Mitsubishi Lancer Evo 8

2008 Steve Glenney / Bernie Webb - Subaru WRX Sti

2007 Nick Streckeinsen / Mike Dale - Mitsubishi Lancer Evo 9

2006 Declan Dwyer / Craig Adams - Mitsubishi Lancer Evo 3

Further reading
"Entries flood in for Adelaide Hills Tarmac Rally", RallySport Mag
"Sims and Sims go Back to Back at the Adelaide Hills Tarmac Rally", SA Rally, 2012
"EXCLUSIVE: Amy Gillett Foundation To Benefit From ASP Adelaide Hills Tarmac Rally", SA Rally, 2008
"Two critical after Adelaide Hills Tarmac Rally crash", The Advertiser (Adelaide), 30 May 2011

External links
 Official Adelaide Hills Tarmac Rally web site

Motorsport competitions in Australia
Rally competitions in Australia
Sport in Adelaide